Russell Street may refer to:

Russell Street (Baltimore), part of the Baltimore–Washington Parkway within Baltimore
Russell Street, Melbourne
Russell Street, Hong Kong
Great Russell Street, London